Yamatosa is a genus of wrinkled bark beetles in the family Carabidae, found in Asia.

Species
These 15 species belong to the genus Yamatosa:

 Yamatosa arrowi (Grouvelle, 1908)
 Yamatosa bacca R.T. Bell & J.R. Bell, 2011
 Yamatosa boysi (Arrow, 1901)
 Yamatosa draco (R.T. Bell, 1977)
 Yamatosa jakli Hovorka, 2010
 Yamatosa kabakovi R.T. Bell & J.R.Bell, 1985
 Yamatosa kryzhanovskyi R.T. Bell & J.R.Bell, 1985
 Yamatosa longior (Grouvelle, 1903)
 Yamatosa niponensis (Lewis, 1888)
 Yamatosa peninsularis (Arrow, 1942)
 Yamatosa phuka R.T. Bell & J.R.Bell, 2009
 Yamatosa reitteri (R.T. Bell, 1977)
 Yamatosa schawalleri R.T. Bell & J.R.Bell, 2002
 Yamatosa sinensis R.T. Bell & J.R.Bell, 1987
 Yamatosa smetanorum R.T. Bell & J.R.Bell, 1989

References

Rhysodinae
Carabidae genera